The 2014 AFC Futsal Championship was held in Vietnam from 30 April to 10 May 2014. 16 countries took part in the 13th edition of the tournament. Japan won the championship and successfully defended their title from the 2012 AFC Futsal Championship.

Qualified teams

Venues

Draw
The 16 teams were drawn into four groups of four teams. The teams were seeded according to their performance in the previous season in 2012.

Group stage
If two or more teams are equal on points on completion of the group matches, the following criteria were applied to determine the rankings.
 Greater number of points obtained in the group matches between the teams concerned;
 Goal difference resulting from the group matches between the teams concerned;
 Greater number of goals scored in the group matches between the teams concerned;
 Goal difference in all the group matches;
 Greater number of goals scored in all the group matches;
 Kicks from the penalty mark if only two teams are involved and they are both on the field of play;
 Fewer score calculated according to the number of yellow and red cards received in the group matches;
 Drawing of lots.

All times are local (UTC+7).

Group A

Group B

Group C

Group D

Knockout stage
In the knockout stage, extra time and penalty shoot-out are used to decide the winner if necessary (no extra time is used in the third place match).

Quarter-finals

Semi-finals

Third place play-off

Final

Goalscorers
15 goals

  Hossein Tayyebi

8 goals

  Ali Asghar Hassanzadeh
  Nobuya Osodo

7 goals

  Vahid Shafiei
  Suphawut Thueanklang

References

External links
AFC Futsal Championship, the-AFC.com

2014
Championship
2014 in Vietnamese football
2014